Jimmy Radafison (born March 15, 1980) is a Malagasy footballer currently plays for Saint Louis Suns United.

Honours

Club

Stade Olympique de l'Emyrne	
THB Champions League (1) : Champion : 2001

Leopards Transfoot Toamasina
 Coupe de Madagascar (1) : 2003 

St. Louis Suns United
 Seychelles FA Cup (1) : 2010

St. Michel United
 Seychelles First Division (2) : 2014,2015

Côte d'Or FC
 Seychelles First Division (1) : 2016

National Team
Football at the Indian Ocean Island Games silver medal:2007

References

External links
 

1980 births
Living people
Malagasy footballers
Madagascar international footballers
Association football defenders
Japan Actuel's FC players
SO Emyrne players
Léopards de Transfoot players
FC BFV players
Saint Louis Suns United FC players
Malagasy expatriate footballers
Expatriate footballers in Seychelles
Malagasy expatriate sportspeople in Seychelles